Schöhsee is a lake in Schleswig-Holstein, Germany. At an elevation of 22 m, its surface area is 0.78 km².

Lakes of Schleswig-Holstein
Plön